Ganophyllum falcatum, commonly known as the scaly ash, is an evergreen rainforest tree. It grows up to 32 metres high and has rough, flaky bark. The species was described by  German-Dutch botanist Carl Ludwig Blume in 1851 based on plant material collected from the coast of New Guinea.It is native to Africa, the Andaman Islands, Asia, Malesia and northern Australia. The ovoid fruits are consumed by fruit pigeons and cassowaries.

References

External links

Dodonaeoideae
Trees of Australia
Sapindales of Australia
Flora of New Guinea
Flora of the Northern Territory
Flora of Queensland
Rosids of Western Australia
Drought-tolerant trees